Björk, Björck, Biörck, or Bjork is a Swedish surname meaning birch. 
It is also an Icelandic name given to girls, meaning birch, specifically the most common native tree of Iceland, Betula pubescens tortuosa (Arctic downy birch). 

Notable people with the name include

Given name
 Björk Guðmundsdóttir (born 1965), Icelandic singer
 Hera Björk Þórhallsdóttir (born 1972), Icelandic singer

Surname
Alexander Björk (born 1990), Swedish professional golfer
Anders Björck (born 1944), Swedish politician
Anita Björk (1923–2012), Swedish actress
Arne Björk (1911–1996), Swedish dentist
Brant Bjork (born 1973), American musician
Carl-Johan Björk (born 1982), Swedish-born American football player
Cheng Yuk Han Bjork (born 1980), Chinese fencer
Fabian Biörck (1893–1977), Swedish gymnast
Fredrik Björck (born 1979), Swedish footballer
Gottfrid Björck (1893–1981), Swedish Army major general 
Hildegard Björck (1847–1920), the first Swedish woman to complete an academic degree
Jakob Björck (1727/28–1793), Swedish portrait painter
Johan Björk (born 1984), Swedish ice hockey player
Nils Björk (1898–1989), Swedish Army lieutenant general 
Nina Björk  (born 1967), Swedish feminist author
Oscar Björck (1860–1929), Swedish painter
Patrik Björck (born 1957), Swedish politician
Peder Björk (born 1975), Swedish politician
Philip R. Bjork, American geologist
Robert A. Bjork (born 1939), American psychologist
Svante Björck, Swedish geologist
Thed Björk (born 1980), Swedish racing driver
Therese Björk (born 1981), Swedish footballer
Viking Björk (1918–2009), Swedish cardiac surgeon

See also
Björk (disambiguation)
Bjørk, Norwegian equivalent
Birk, Estonian given name and surname
Bajorek, Polish surname

Icelandic feminine given names
Swedish-language surnames